Krešimir Ljubičić (born July 11, 1998) is a Croatian professional basketball player for Cibona of the Croatian League and the ABA League.

References

External links
 ABA League Profile
 RealGM Profile
 Eurobasket Profile

1998 births
Living people
ABA League players
Croatian expatriate basketball people in France
Croatian men's basketball players
Centers (basketball)
Basketball players from Zagreb
KK Cibona players
KK Gorica players